Dasyatis (Greek δασύς dasýs meaning rough or dense and βατίς batís meaning skate) is a genus of stingray in the family Dasyatidae that is native to the Atlantic, including the Mediterranean. In a 2016 taxonomic revision, many of the species formerly assigned to Dasyatis were reassigned to other genera (Bathytoshia, Fontitrygon, Hemitrygon, Hypanus, Megatrygon and Telatrygon).

Species

Dasyatis dipterura (D. S. Jordan & C. H. Gilbert, 1880) (diamond stingray)
Dasyatis chrysonota A. Smith, 1828 (blue stingray)
Dasyatis hypostigma H. R. S. Santos & M. R. de Carvalho, 2004 (groovebelly stingray)
Dasyatis marmorata Steindachner, 1892 (marbled stingray)
Dasyatis pastinaca Linnaeus, 1758 (common stingray)
Dasyatis tortonesei Capapé, 1975 (Tortonese's stingray)
Fossil species
† Dasyatis africana Arambourg, 1947

See also
 List of prehistoric cartilaginous fish

References

 
Ray genera
Cenomanian genus first appearances
Taxa named by Constantine Samuel Rafinesque
Extant Cenomanian first appearances